Kanna Unnai Thedukiren is a 2001 Tamil-language drama film, written and directed by Jeeva Selvaraj. The film stars Sathyan, Suvalakshmi and Anju Aravind. The music for the film was composed by Ilaiyaraaja and the film opened to mixed reviews in August 2001, after several delays. It is a remake of the 1996 Malayalam film Ee Puzhayum Kadannu

Cast
 Sathyan as Prakash
 Suvalakshmi as Anjali
 Anju Aravind
 Ranjith
 Ponvannan
 Vivek
 S. N. Lakshmi
 Mahendran

Production
The film began production in August 1999 and was revealed to be a remake of the 1996 Malayalam film, Ee Puzhayum Kadannu. The film was briefly retitled as Kannan Varum Neram before the makers reverted to the original title.

Release
The film released in August 2001 to mixed reviews, with a critic noting "the film might have turned into a success provided it has had a good screenplay, but the "film lacks in speed" and "Sathyan, young as he is, is unable to carry the whole film on his shoulders". The film did not perform well at the box office and became Sathyan's final film as a lead actor. He subsequently chose to feature in films as a comedian.

Soundtrack
The film's soundtrack was composed by Ilaiyaraaja and released as an album during May 2000.

References

2001 films
2000s Tamil-language films
Indian drama films
2001 drama films
Tamil remakes of Malayalam films
Films scored by Ilaiyaraaja